For Queen and Country is a 1988 crime drama film co-written and directed by Martin Stellman and starring Denzel Washington in Panavision. Washington stars as Reuben James, a Black British former paratrooper, who joined the British Army to escape the poverty of inner city London; Reuben fights in the Falklands War, and upon returning home he finds that society ignores and challenges him while trying to adjust to normal life.

The film received mixed reviews and was a box office flop. It has recently been reevaluated as a serious critique of Thatcherism and its effects on the UK in the 1980s.

Plot
In 1979, during the height of The Troubles, Black British paratrooper Reuben James (Washington) is attacked by IRA militants while leaving a pub in Northern Ireland. His life is saved by a fellow soldier and Londoner, Tony (Dorian Healy), who goes by the nickname Fish. In 1982, Reuben and Fish are taking part in the re-taking of the Falkland Islands, along with another soldier from London, Bob Harper (Sean Chapman).

In 1988, Reuben leaves the army and returns to his old neighbourhood in the East End of London. Almost immediately, he is harassed by police officers, including the overtly racist Challoner (Craig Fairbrass) and Kilcoyne (George Baker). Walking around his housing estate, Reuben quickly realises the poverty and malaise he joined the army to escape hasn't changed. His childhood friend Lynford (Geff Francis) is still selling stolen goods and running other small-time hustles. Another longtime friend, Colin (Bruce Payne) is now the local kingpin, selling drugs in large quantities and bribing police. Fish, who lost his leg in the Falklands, is a degenerate gambler who cheats on his pregnant Irish wife, Debbie (Stella Gonet). Bob has joined the police force. Colin offers to make Reuben a part of his drug dealing operation, but Reuben declines.

Fish and Reuben attempt to go to a nightclub to celebrate Reuben's return to civilian life, but are turned away by the bouncer. The two get into a fight with nightclub security and spend the night drinking at Fish's flat instead. When Reuben comes home, he finds his flat being burgled by two local children, Oscar and Hayley. Reuben threatens Oscar until he points out Hayley's flat. Hayley's mother, Stacey (Amanda Redman), answers the door and denies that her daughter lives there. Reuben barges into the flat and begins to search it, looking for both Hayley and his belongings. Stacey threatens him with a kitchen knife to get him to leave. On his way out, Hayley comes home wearing Reuben's paratrooper beret and he takes it back. Later, Stacey finds Reuben's campaign medals from the Falklands and comes to his door to return them.

Reuben begins to look for a civilian job using his old army connections, but none of them will return his calls. Frustrated, he goes to a local pub where Lynford is shooting pool. Challoner and Kilcoyne enter the pub and begin aggressively questioning Lynford about his whereabouts during a robbery. Lynford says he was with Reuben. Reuben lies and confirms his story. Kilcoyne decides to take Reuben at his word.

Reuben runs into Colin who takes him to see the legitimate business he's bought, a health club. Once again, Colin asks Reuben to join him, but Reuben still refuses.

Bob and Fish come to Reuben's flat. Fish is flush from a big gambling win. Fish shows Reuben two airline tickets to Paris and says that he is taking Reuben on a trip, in part to thank him for covering an earlier debt with Bob. The three go to a party on the estate. At the party, Lynford thanks Reuben for backing him up with the police. Reuben once again encounters Stacey, the two dance, and Reuben walks her home. On the way home, they're subjected to racist insults from a group of police officers. When they finally reach her door, Stacey kisses Reuben on the cheek. He returns to the party, but finds it being raided by the police, including Kilcoyne and Challoner. He watches several of his friends, including Lynford, getting arrested, but Bob tells him not to get involved.

The next morning, Reuben and Fish are at Reuben's flat. Reuben gets a phone call saying that Debbie has given birth early. Reuben takes Fish to the hospital, and Fish gives him both tickets to Paris, saying he won't be able to go now.

Reuben takes Stacey and Hayley to a funfair, where he asks Stacey to go with him to Paris. She agrees until she sees Reuben playing a shooting game. She becomes upset and storms off. He catches up with her and she explains that Hayley's father was a gangster who kept guns in the house, including in Hayley's crib. Reuben comforts her and tells her he was done with guns when he left the army. On the ride home Stacey offers to get Reuben a job with her, driving a minicab.

When they get back to the estate, there's a commotion going on. Three people bump into them, running away. Reuben recognizes one of them as Lynford. He sees the source of the commotion: someone has thrown a brick through a police car windshield from above, killing well-liked local constable Harry. Reuben realises Lynford was responsible. Kilcoyne threatens the gathered crowd and picks out Reuben, asking him if he saw anything, which he denies.

While preparing for the trip to Paris, Reuben applies for a new passport and is rejected. He finds out that since he was born in St. Lucia, a change in British nationality law has effectively stripped him of his citizenship in spite of the fact he has lived almost his entire life in London, or serving in the British army.

Disillusioned and angry, Reuben finally agrees to work as muscle for Colin. On his way to meet Colin with a gun tucked into his waistband, he runs into Stacey. When she hugs him, she discovers the gun and leaves, furious. Colin and Reuben go to make an exchange with another drug dealer, Sadiq (Jimmi Harkishin), in a public toilet. As they leave after completing the deal, the police rush in and arrest Sadiq. Colin tells Reuben that he set Sadiq up. When they get back to the estate, Reuben gives Colin back his gun and quits.

Reuben goes to Fish's flat and discovers Fish distraught, shooting up his home with a rifle. He says Debbie has left him and taken the children to Ireland. Reuben gives him some money from the deal with Colin and tells him to go after her. Reuben comes home to find Kilcoyne in his flat. Kilcoyne tells Reuben he knows about the deal with Colin and Sadiq, and threatens to send him to jail unless Reuben tells him who killed Harry. Reuben reluctantly gives up Lynford.

Wanting to leave the increasingly hopeless situation on the estate behind, Reuben gets a St. Lucian passport and a ticket to St. Lucia. Walking home, he comes across Lynford and a mob of other locals with bats, knives, Molotov cocktails, and a gun, preparing for a confrontation with the police. Lynford and Reuben argue, and Reuben leaves to get ready to go to St. Lucia.

Lynford walks across the estate and the police chase him. From a walkway, someone drops a Molotov cocktail onto a police car, starting a riot.

With his bag packed for St. Lucia, Reuben runs into Fish in the lift. He tells Fish of his plans and the two joke and banter. When the door opens, they find Lynford hiding from police on the ground floor. Lynford points his gun at Reuben and accuses Reuben of giving him up to the police, but Fish tackles him. Kilcoyne and another officer rush through the door. Fish stands up and Challoner panics, and shoots and kills him. Overcome with grief, Reuben goes to Fish's flat to retrieve his rifle. In the chaos of the riot, he shoots and kills Challoner. As he walks the estate holding the rifle, we see Reuben in the sights of a police sniper, who is revealed to be Bob. A voice off-screen orders Bob to take the shot. As a single gunshot rings out, the screen goes black.

Cast
 Denzel Washington as Reuben James
 Dorian Healy as Fish
 Bruce Payne as Colin
 Amanda Redman as Stacey
 Sean Chapman as Bob Harper
 Graham McTavish as Lieutenant
 Geff Francis as Lynford
 Frank Harper as Mickey
 Craig Fairbrass as Challoner
 Michael Bray as Bryant
 George Baker as Kilcoyne
 Stella Gonet as Debbie
 Colin Thomas as Feargal
 Ken Stott as Civil Servant
 Brian McDermott as Harry
 Jimmi Harkishin as Sadiq

Stephen Lawrence connection
Stephen Lawrence, the teenager whose murder led to a massive reform of the Metropolitan Police Service, was an extra in this film.

Release
The film opened in 33 theaters in North America, grossing $62,771 during the opening weekend. It went on to gross a total $191,051. It was released on DVD on June 1, 2004.

Reception
Film aggregator site Rotten Tomatoes gave the film a 29% rating and an average rating of 5.4/10 based on fourteen reviews. Leonard Maltin described the film as a "striking, laced-in-acid contemporary thriller of life in Thatcherite Britain".

Accolades

References

External links
 
 
 
 

1988 films
1988 crime drama films
American crime drama films
British crime drama films
Atlantic Entertainment Group films
Working Title Films films
Films produced by Tim Bevan
1988 directorial debut films
1980s English-language films
1980s American films
1980s British films